National Highway 531 (NH 531) is a  National Highway in India.

References

National highways in India